On the Strength of All Convinced is Daphne Loves Derby's first physically released studio album. The album, released on July 26, 2005, is almost entirely original material except for Middle Middle, which was previously released on Purevolume.

Track listing
"Sundays"  – 3:48
"Hammers and Hearts"  – 2:55
"A Year on an Airplane"  – 3:19
"Birthday Gallery"  – 3:28
"You Versus the Sea"  – 3:00
"Kirby"  – 3:30
"Middle Middle"  – 3:36
"Pollen and Salt"  – 4:28
"If You're Lucky, No One Will Get Hurt"  – 2:26
"Debussie"  – 2:30
"What We Have Been Waiting For"  – 8:15

Note: "What We Have Been Waiting For" contains a 3:15 hidden track, entitled "Dirt Doesn't Travel."

Band members
Kenny Choi - Guitar, keyboard, percussion, lead vocals
Jason Call - Bass, keyboard, percussion, vocals
Stu Clay - Drums, percussion

2005 albums
Daphne Loves Derby albums